Odontamblyopus tenuis is a species of eel goby native to fresh, brackish and marine coastal waters from Pakistan and Myanmar.  This species can reach a length of  SL.

References

Amblyopinae
Fish described in 1876